The Azerbaijan Handball Premier League is the top men's team handball league in Azerbaijan.

Past champions

 1992 : 
 1993 : 
 1994 : Umud Baku
 1995 : 
 1996 : 
 1997 : 
 1998 : 
 1999 : 
 2000 : 
 2001 : 
 2002 : HC Spartak Baku
 2003 : DIN Baku
 2004 : DIN Baku (2)
 2005 : DIN Baku (3)
 2006 : DIN Baku (4)
 2007 : DIN Baku (5)
 2008 : 
 2009 : 
 2010 : 
 2011 : 
 2012 : 
 2013 : 
 2014 : 
 2015 : AZAL Baku
 2016 : Mahsul-Nasimi
 2017 : Mahsul-Nasimi (2)
 2018 : HC Baku

References
 handball.az

PremierLeague
Azerbaiajan
Sports leagues in Azerbaijan